Master Seven is the sixth album by the hard rock band Kingdom Come.

Track listing

Personnel 
Kingdom Come
Lenny Wolf – vocals, rhythm guitar, producer, mixing
Marcus Deml – lead guitar
Oliver Kiessner – rhythm and acoustic guitars
Mark Smith – bass

Additional musicians
Dion Murdock – drums
Bjorn Tiemann – strings, orchestration and other noise

Production
Angi Schiliro – engineer, mixing
Glen Miller – mastering
Joerg Dogondke – executive producer

References

External links
 Lenny Wolf homepage

1997 albums
Kingdom Come (band) albums